The Erik Barnouw Award—also known as the OAH Erik Barnouw Award—is named after the late Erik Barnouw, a Columbia University historian and professor who was a specialist in mass media. The OAH -- Organization of American Historians -- gives one or two awards annually to recognize excellent programs, from mass media or documentary films, that relate to American history or further its study. The award was first presented in 1983.

List of winners
1983 – Brooklyn Bridge
1984 – Vietnam: A Television History
1985 – Solomon Northup's Odyssey / The Legacy of Harry Truman
1986 – Huey Long
1987 – no award
1988 – Radio Bikini / The Secret Government: The Constitution in Crisis
1989 – Indians, Outlaws and Angie Debo
1990 – Adam Clayton Powell
1991 – Eyes on the Prize 
1992 – Coney Island / Color Adjustment
1993 – In the White Man's Image
1994 – At the River I Stand
1995 – Freedom on My Mind
1996 – America's War
1997 – The West
1998 – The Richest Man in the World: Andrew Carnegie
1999 - A Paralyzing Fear: The Story of Polio in America
2000 - I’ll Make Me a World: A Century of African-American Art
2001 - Freedom Never Dies: The Legacy of Harry T. Moore
2002 - Scottsboro: An American Tragedy
2003 - The Good War and Those Who Refused to Fight It
2004 - Partners of the Heart
2005 - Reconstruction: the Second Civil War
2006 - Negroes with Guns: Rob Williams and Black Power
2007 - The Gold Rush
2008 - Through Deaf Eyes
2009 - Wings of Defeat
2010 - Passage
2011 - The Most Dangerous Man in America: Daniel Ellsberg and the Pentagon Papers
2012 - The Pruitt-Igoe Myth
2013 - Death and the Civil War
2014 - Honor & Sacrifice: The Roy Matsumoto Story
2015 - The Roosevelts: An Intimate History
2016 - No más bebés
2017 - The Mine Wars
2018 - The Vietnam War
2019 - The Chinese Exclusion Act
2020 - Chasing the Moon 
2021 - The People Vs. Agent Orange
2022 - Look Away, Look Away

References

External links
 http://www.columbia.edu/cu/news/01/07/erikBarnouw.html

American awards